The First League of Yugoslavia's 1991/1992 season was the 64th edition of the Yugoslav First League, the premier football club competition of SFR Yugoslavia. It was the last edition in which professional football teams from SR Bosnia and Herzegovina (with one exception) and SR Macedonia participated, as well as the last of the SFR Yugoslavia in general as the First League of FR Yugoslavia was established the following season. Red Star Belgrade won the competition.

Before the start of the season, Croatia and Slovenia were already in the process of seeking independence from Yugoslavia. Teams from Croatia and Slovenia that qualified for the competition left it before the season started. Dinamo Zagreb, Hajduk Split, NK Osijek, NK Rijeka and (newly promoted) NK Zagreb left to join newly created Croatian championship, while Olimpija Ljubljana left to join newly created Slovenian championship. Thus, this season was competed only by teams from SR Serbia, SR Montenegro, SR Bosnia and Herzegovina and SR Macedonia. During the course of the season, first Macedonia, and then Bosnia and Herzegovina also declared independence from Yugoslavia, and the Bosnian War started. Because of that, Željezničar Sarajevo missed the second half of the season, and three more Bosnian teams (Sarajevo, Sloboda Tuzla, and Velež Mostar) left the competition six rounds before its completion. Remaining Bosnian team (Borac Banja Luka) and two Macedonian teams played the whole season. 

After the season was concluded, Macedonian teams left the competition to join the newly created Macedonian First League. Three ethnic football leagues were created in Bosnia and Herzegovina for the next season: first, the Croats formed the First League of Herzeg-Bosnia, then the Bosniaks formed the Championship of Bosnia and Herzegovina which later became the UEFA recognized competition. Lastly, the Serbs formed the First League of the Republika Srpska. Thus, the following 1992–93 season of the Yugoslav First League was played by teams from SR Yugoslavia (Serbia and Montenegro) and one Bosnian team – Borac Banja Luka which played its home games in Belgrade. Because of the large numbers of teams leaving the league, seven new teams were promoted to the first league for 1992–93 season, all from Serbia and Montenegro: Napredak Kruševac, Hajduk Kula, Bečej, Mogren Budva, Kikinda, Radnički Novi Beograd, and FK Pristina.

League table

Results
Results in brackets indicate the results from penalty shoot-outs whenever games were drawn.

Winning squad

Top scorers

See also
1991–92 Yugoslav Second League
1991–92 Yugoslav Cup

References

Yugoslav First League seasons
Yugo
1991–92 in Yugoslav football